First Lady of the Democratic Republic of the Congo (French: Première Dame de la République démocratique du Congo) is the title attributed to the wife of the president of the Democratic Republic of the Congo.  The country's current first lady is Denise Tshisekedi, wife of President Félix Tshisekedi, who had held the title since January 24, 2019.

The country was known as Zaire from 1971 until 1997.

List of first ladies of the Democratic Republic of the Congo

References

 

Congo, Democratic Republic of the
Politics of the Democratic Republic of the Congo